Inspector De Luca may refer to:

Inspector De Luca (novel series), a trilogy of Italian crime novels by Carlo Lucarelli, and its protagonist, Achille de Luca
Inspector De Luca (TV series), a 2008 TV series based on the novels